Pizzicato Pussycat is a 1955 Warner Bros. Merrie Melodies animated short directed by Friz Freleng. The short was released on January 1, 1955.

The cartoon is about a talented piano-playing mouse becoming a slave to a house cat.

Plot
Mr. and Mrs. John and Vy Jones, a typical suburban couple, keep hearing piano music playing, but can't figure out where it's coming from ... even days after their daughter Mary Lou's toy piano (and sheet music) had gone missing.  One day, their cat catches a mouse, but the mouse pleads with the cat to spare him his life if he can prove to the cat that he's "...a very fine pianist".  The cat agrees, so the mouse asks the cat to retrieve the piano and gives the mouse some sheet music to play.

Once the cat hears the music, he is astounded.  When Mr. and Mrs. Jones hear the music from the other room and approach, the cat hides the mouse and the little piano inside the real piano, and pretends to play it as the Joneses look on. Surprised by what they see, Mrs. Jones immediately calls the United Press. The cat promises to spare the mouse if he can play the piano while the cat continues to pretend, hoping that his success might make him famous.

Suddenly there is a flurry of media activity around the house.  The cat is examined by scientists, but they are unable to find anything abnormal about the cat; for instance, an x-ray of his brain shows it to be the size of a peanut.

Soon, there are agents obtaining signed contracts for the cat to appear in public performances.  One night, the cat performs at Carnegie Hall, displacing "Leopold Stabowski".  The cat is dubbed "Miracle Cat" and while a disbelieving audience awaits the cat's debut, the cat drags the mouse on stage behind the curtain and puts him into the piano and tells him that when he gives the signal, to start playing.  The mouse agrees.

The curtain rises, the Joneses sit proudly in a theater box, the cat walks proudly out on stage and takes his seat at the piano.  The signal is given (a tap on the mouse's head by a piano key), and the mouse starts playing "Hungarian Rhapsody" by Franz Liszt.  The mouse pauses playing after the first few bars, and at the same time the cat falls from his piano stool after playing an arpeggio; the re-adjusts himself on the stool, and again taps the mouse on the head, but this time, the mouse's head is turned, and his glasses are broken by the piano key, and he can no longer read the sheet music in front of him.  He plays on, despite not being able to read the music, and it turns out to be a disaster.  The cat is truly embarrassed, and audience members walk out of the Hall while calling the performance "ridiculous", "insulting", and "preposterous," and the Joneses narrowly escape out the stage entrance. The cat is exposed as a fraud which causes an uproar in the music world.

Home again, the Joneses are relaxing, as the cat and mouse become typical enemies again, but this time, the cat ends up trying to hit the mouse with drumsticks on the drum set. (In the unedited version, the mouse tries to escape with a cymbal on his head to symbolize a coolie hat, accompanied by Asian-sounding music, a scene which was considered offensive to some and therefore was cut from the original cartoon)  The cat starts playing the drums and becomes intrigued by the beat.  The mouse becomes excited by this and pulls his piano out of his hole, and the pair begin playing jazz. As Mrs. Jones tries to call the United Press again until Mr. Jones says: "Oh, no.  No you don't!  
," then reminding her that "We're not going through that again!", and hangs up the phone upon witnessing the events.

Mr. and Mrs. Jones continue to enjoy the music as we see them relaxing to it in their easy chairs. The narrator closes by saying the couple dare never to tell anyone of their unusual house pets.

Music
 "Waltz Op. 64 No. 1 in D flat major" (uncredited) aka "Minute Waltz" by Frédéric Chopin
 "Crazy Rhythm" (uncredited), by Joseph Meyer and Roger Wolfe Kahn
 "Me-ow" (uncredited), by Mel B. Kaufman
 "Home Sweet Home" (uncredited) aka "There's No Place Like Home", by H.R. Bishop
 "Liebestraum No. 3" (uncredited), by Franz Liszt
 "Hungarian Rhapsody No. 14" (uncredited), by Franz Liszt

References

See also
List of American films of 1955

1955 films
Merrie Melodies short films
Short films directed by Friz Freleng
Films scored by Milt Franklyn
1950s Warner Bros. animated short films
1950s English-language films
1950s American animated films
1955 animated films
1955 short films
Films about pianos and pianists
Animated films about cats
Animated films about mice